The Conservative Campaign Headquarters (CCHQ), formerly known as Conservative Central Office (CCO), is the headquarters of the British Conservative Party, housing its central staff and committee members, including campaign coordinators and managers.

Campaigning
CCHQ is responsible for all campaigning of the Conservative Party, though it delegates responsibility for local campaigns to constituency Conservative Associations. It maintains overall responsibility for targeting voters and seats, including shortlisting and finalising the selection of Conservative candidates across the United Kingdom for local and national elections.

CCHQ is used as a phone bank for volunteers, and is most active at general elections and some by-elections. The CCHQ Voter Communications Team also coordinates and manages data from local Conservative call centres.

Following the 2017 general election in which the Conservative Party did not do as well as had been expected, CCHQ was described as “rusty” and less effective as it had been during previous elections in coordinating and managing its campaign.

The call centre in Neath was the subject of scrutiny by The Electoral Commission following an investigation by The Guardian over alleged breach of marketing rules at a phone bank at Neath in Wales, which had employed paid staff to do its calling instead of volunteers and is alleged to have bribed some staff for underhand calling tactics. Subsequent allegations have also been reported about the conduct of other Conservative staff.

The CCHQ phone bank, uses the Conservative Party's online calling database, ‘’Votesource’’. This database was created in-house, but has not always functioned efficiently.

The CCHQ Activist Centre which is the section of CCHQ which provides guidance to local Conservative Associations and candidates was closed down following the 2017 general election, with resources now being distributed directly by staff rather than passively through the online database to external Conservative staff.

CCHQ is presided over by the Chairman of the Conservative Party with assistance from the Conservative Director of Communications.

Location
Until 1958 CCO was based at Abbey House, Victoria Street, London, then moving to No. 32 Smith Square. This was the scene of many televised historic moments in Conservative history from Margaret Thatcher's victory rallies to Iain Duncan Smith's resignation. CCO moved in 2004 to nearby 25 Victoria Street for more high-tech facilities and subsequently became known as Conservative Campaign Headquarters (CCHQ).

On 6 March 2007, CCHQ moved again, this time to 30 Millbank, part of the property portfolio of David and Simon Reuben. On 10 February 2014, CCHQ moved to its current location at 4 Matthew Parker Street. They rent the ground and basement floors of the commercial property.

Establishment
The establishment of Conservative Central Office dates back to 1871, with the creation of professional support for the Party by Sir John Gorst. Following election defeats in 1906 and 1910, in 1911 the post of Party Chairman was created to oversee the work of the Central Office.

Incidents and controversies
On 10 November 2010, 30 Millbank was attacked by student protesters as part of a demonstration against rises in tuition fees.

On 19 November 2014, demonstrators taking part in a free education demonstration in central London clashed with police outside 4 Matthew Parker Street, where the Conservative Campaign Headquarters relocated in February 2014.

In June 2017, following the 2017 general election, CCHQ was blamed for the worse-than-expected result, with a number of new appointments, such as new Conservative Director of Communications, Carrie Symonds. Ms. Symonds claimed that there was "lots to do" in her new role.

"factcheckUK"
On 19 November 2019, for the duration of a televised leadership debate between the leader Boris Johnson and his Labour counterpart Jeremy Corbyn, hosted by ITV in the run up to the 2019 general election, the CCHQ press office's Twitter page (@CCHQPress) was renamed to 'factcheckUK' – it did not change the Twitter handle to maintain the account's verified status, to post Conservative rebuttals to Labour's statements about them during the debate.

Conservative Party chairman James Cleverly defended it, stating "The Twitter handle of the CCHQ press office remained CCHQPress, so it's clear the nature of the site", and as "calling out when the Labour Party put what they know to be complete fabrications in the public domain".

In response, the Electional Commission, which does not have a role in regulating election campaign content, called on all campaigners to act "responsibly", fact-checking body Full Fact criticised this behaviour as "inappropriate and misleading", and a spokesperson from Twitter said that "Any further attempts to mislead people by editing verified profile information - in a manner seen during the UK Election Debate - will result in decisive corrective action."

References

External links
 Conservative Central Office archives

Central Office
Headquarters of political parties
1870 establishments in the United Kingdom
Headquarters in the United Kingdom